Luke Thomas Baldauf (also spelled Bauldauf, born January 2, 1969) is a windsurfer who represented the United States Virgin Islands. He competed in the Division II event at the 1988 Summer Olympics.

References

External links
 
 

1969 births
Living people
United States Virgin Islands male sailors (sport)
Olympic sailors of the United States Virgin Islands
Sailors at the 1988 Summer Olympics – Division II
Place of birth missing (living people)